Market City in Canning Vale is the successor to the earlier Perth Metropolitan Markets which had operated in the Perth CBD from 1929 to 1998.

It is the current central wholesale market of fruit and vegetable produce in Western Australia, which was organised by the Metropolitan Market Trust, and is currently operated by the Perth Market Authority.

It is also a location of offices that consider the marketing and distribution of produce internationally and nationally.

Notes

Canning Vale, Western Australia
Wholesale markets in Australia